Nazi architecture is the architecture promoted by Adolf Hitler and the Nazi regime from 1933 until its fall in 1945, connected with urban planning in Nazi Germany. It is characterized by three forms: a stripped neoclassicism, typified by the designs of Albert Speer; a vernacular style that drew inspiration from traditional rural architecture, especially alpine; and a utilitarian style followed for major infrastructure projects and industrial or military complexes. Nazi ideology took a pluralist attitude to architecture; however, Hitler himself believed that form follows function and wrote against "stupid imitations of the past".

While similar to Classicism, the official Nazi style is distinguished by the impression it leaves on viewers. Architectural style was used by the Nazis to deliver and enforce their ideology. Formal elements like flat roofs, horizontal extension, uniformity, and the lack of decor created "an impression of simplicity, uniformity, monumentality, solidity and eternity," which is how the Nazi Party wanted to appear.

Seven buildings in the style of Franconian half-timbered houses were constructed in Nuremberg in 1939 and 1940.

German Jewish architects were banned, e.g. Erich Mendelsohn and Julius Posener emigrated in 1933.

Forced labor

The construction of new buildings served other purposes beyond reaffirming Nazi ideology. In Flossenbürg and elsewhere, the Schutzstaffel built forced-labor camps where prisoners of the Third Reich were forced to mine stone and make bricks, much of which went directly to Albert Speer for use in his rebuilding of Berlin and other projects in Germany. These new buildings were also built by forced-laborers. Working conditions were harsh, and many laborers died. This process of mining and construction allowed Nazis to fulfill political and economic goals simultaneously while creating buildings that fulfilled ideological expression goals.

Welthauptstadt Germania
The crowning achievement of this movement was to be Welthauptstadt Germania, the projected renewal of the German capital Berlin following the Nazis' presumed victory of World War II. Speer, who oversaw the project, produced most of the plans for the new city. Only a small portion of the "World Capital" was ever built between 1937 and 1943. The plan's core features included the creation of a great neoclassical city based on an East-West axis with the Berlin Victory Column at its centre. A great number of historic buildings in the city were demolished in the planned construction zones. However, with defeat of the Third Reich, the work was never started.

Nazi Austria

Greater Vienna

Greater Vienna was the second-largest city of the Reich, three times greater than old Vienna.

Linz
Linz was one of the Führer cities. Only Nibelungen Bridge was constructed.

Housing construction
The Nazis constructed many apartments, 100,000 of them in Berlin alone, mostly as housing estates e.g. in Grüne Stadt (Green Town) in Prenzlauer Berg. Volkswagen's city  was originally constructed by the Nazis.

Proponents

 Hermann Bartels
 Peter Behrens
 German Bestelmeyer
 Paul Bonatz
 Woldemar Brinkmann
 Walter Brugmann
 Richard Ermisch
 Gottfried Feder
 Roderich Fick
 Theodor Fischer
 Leonhard Gall
 Hermann Giesler
 Wilhelm Grebe
 Johann Friedrich Höger
 Eugen Hönig
 Clemens Klotz
 Wilhelm Kreis
 Werner March
 Konrad Nonn
 Ludwig Ruff
 Franz Ruff
 Ernst Sagebiel
 Paul Schmitthenner
 Julius Schulte-Frohlinde
 Paul Schultze-Naumburg
 Alexander von Senger
 Albert Speer
 Paul Troost
 Rudolf Wolters

Surviving examples of Nazi architecture

 The Academy for Youth Leadership in Braunschweig
 The Berchtesgaden Chancellery Branch office in 
 The new terminal building at Berlin Tempelhof Airport
 The widening of the Charlottenburger Chaussee in Berlin
 The former Reichsbank building in Berlin
 The  in Munich
 The  in Weimar
 The  in Munich
 The  in Berchtesgaden
 The Ministry of Aviation building in Berlin
 The Nazi party rally grounds in Nuremberg
 The  in Berlin
 The NS-Ordensburgen Krössinsee, Sonthofen and Vogelsang
 The Prora building complex in Rügen
 The Theater Saarbrücken in Saarbrücken
 The Mausoleum Schlesier-Ehrenmal in Wałbrzych, Poland
 The Lower Silesian Government Office Building in Wrocław, Poland.

See also
 Fascist architecture
 Führer Headquarters
 
 List of Nazi constructions
 Reactionary modernism
 
 Stalinist architecture
 Totalitarian architecture
 Urban planning in Nazi Germany
 Völkisch movement

References

Bibliography

 
 
 
 
 
 
 
  In Internet Archive (1941 edition by Reynal & Hitchcock, New York).
 
 
 
 
 
 
 
 
 
 
 
 
 
 
  In Internet Archive.

External links

 A Theory of Ruin-value , Cornelius Holtorf, last updated on 21 December 2004.
 A Teacher's Guide to the Holocaust website:
 Photos: Third Reich Architecture in Berlin;
 Photos: Third Reich Architecture in Munich.
 NS-Architektur at LEMO – Lebendiges Museum Online.

 
Architectural styles
History of Berlin
Culture in Berlin